, (real name:Feletiliki Mau) (born 21 August 1977) is a Tongan-Japanese rugby union player who played in Japan for World Fighting Bull and also played for the Japan national rugby union team. In 2005, he obtained Japanese citizenship.

Notes

Japanese rugby union players
Tongan emigrants to Japan
Naturalized citizens of Japan
1977 births
Living people
People from Nukuʻalofa
Tongan rugby union players
Japan international rugby union players
Tongan expatriate rugby union players
Expatriate rugby union players in Japan
Tongan expatriate sportspeople in Japan
Rugby union locks